Aleksandr Sergeevich Kozyrev (born 26 August 1986) is a Russian curler from Sochi. At the 2014 Winter Olympics in Sochi, Russia, Kozyrev was the alternate for the Aleksey Stukalskiy team representing Russia. He is currently the coach of Team Sergey Glukhov.

Personal life
Kozyrev is currently married. He was born in Moscow.

References

External links

1986 births
Living people
Curlers at the 2014 Winter Olympics
Russian male curlers
Olympic curlers of Russia
Curlers from Moscow
Sportspeople from Sochi
Russian curling coaches